The Sorii class (ソリイ) was a class of steam tender locomotives of the Chosen Government Railway (Sentetsu) with 2-8-0 wheel arrangement. The "Sori" name came from the American naming system for steam locomotives, under which locomotives with 2-8-0 wheel arrangement were called "Consolidation".

Description
Built by the Baldwin Locomotive Works of the United States in 1894, the ソリイ (Sorii) class locomotives were bought second-hand by the Imperial Japanese Army for use by the Temporary Military Railway in Korea. In 1906, the Temporary Military Railway was taken over the Government-General of Korea to create the National Railway, which became Sentetsu in 1910. First numbered 101–106, they became numbers 1001–1006 in 1918, and finally in Sentetsu's 1938 general renumbering, they were given the numbers ソリイ1 through ソリイ6.

Postwar: Korean National Railroad 소리1 (Sori1) class
After the partition of Korea, all six remained in the South, becoming Korean National Railroad class Sori1 (소리1), numbered 소리1-1 through 소리1-6.

Construction

References

Locomotives of Korea
Locomotives of South Korea
Railway locomotives introduced in 1894
2-8-0 locomotives
Baldwin locomotives